(ApS) is the Danish term for a private limited company. ApS, when appended to the end of a Danish company name, is similar to Ltd. after the name of a British company. An ApS is required to have capital of at least 40 000 DKK (approx. 5 370 EUR).

References

Official registration office for Danish company
Danish Business Authority

Types of business entity
Danish business law